Doug Garwood (born March 31, 1963) is an American professional golfer.

Garwood played college golf at Fresno State University where he was a two-time All-American.

Garwood played on the Nationwide Tour from 2002 to 2005. His best finish was a playoff loss to Andy Miller in the 2002 State Farm Open.

Garwood began playing on the PGA Tour Champions in 2013 and won the 2016 SAS Championship. He was the son of actor Kelton Garwood.

Professional wins (3)

PGA Tour Champions wins (1)

PGA Tour Champions playoff record (0–1)

Other wins (2)
2001 Long Beach Open
2014 Straight Down Fall Classic

Playoff record
Buy.com Tour playoff record (0–1)

References

External links

American male golfers
PGA Tour golfers
PGA Tour Champions golfers
Golfers from California
People from Van Nuys, Los Angeles
1963 births
Living people
People from Chatsworth, Los Angeles